Rommel Rodrigues is an Indian author, film director, screenwriter and producer based out of Mumbai. He has worked in several Indian newspapers, writing on crime, business, politics and current affairs for over two and a half decades and was accredited by the Maharashtra Government for nearly 10 years.  He's a columnist and presently the editor of SEZ Times. 

Rommel Rodrigues is the official spokesperson and head of media & communication for Mumbai Congress. 

Rommel has authored several books, including critically acclaimed bestsellers like Kasab: The Face of 26/11 detailing the 2008 Mumbai attacks, published by Penguin Books and Everything You Wanted to Know About Business & Economics, by CNBC Bestsellers18. Rommel has also edited several books including The Market Mafia : Chronicle of India’s High-Tech Stock Market Scandal & The Cabal That Went Scot-Free by journalist Palak Shah which exposes the role of several people who perpetrated a multi-crore scandal in the largest exchange of the country and the apathy of the regulator.

Rommel is the Writer and Associate Director of Ram Gopal Varma's film The Attacks of 26/11 which was released in 2013 to very positive reviews.

Rommel Rodrigues produced and directed the commercially released Marathi film Gurukul based on his own script.
 
Rommel is producing and directing another Marathi film tentatively titled Ashprushya.

Bibliography
 Kasab: The Face of 26/11 
 Everything You Wanted to Know About Business & Economics 
 Simplifying Business, Economics & Jargons 
 Editor - The Market Mafia : Chronicle of India’s High-Tech Stock Market Scandal & The Cabal That Went Scot-Free

References

Living people
Writers from Mumbai
Journalists from Maharashtra
Year of birth missing (living people)